Jackson County Courthouse is a two-story brick building designed by architect W.W. Thomas and built in 1879 in Jefferson, Georgia.  Its Classical Revival clock tower was added in 1906.  It was one of the first post-Civil War county courthouses built in Georgia.  It is unusual for surviving little-altered since construction. In 2004, a new courthouse was built in Jefferson.

It was renovated in 1978.

Its courtroom has a "Cathedral quilt" pressed metal coved ceiling and egg and dart cornices.

Its architect, William Winstead Thomas (1848-1904), was president of an insurance company but also designed buildings, including the White Hall estate house outside Atlanta and at least two other courthouses.

It was listed on the National Register of Historic Places in 1980.

References

Courthouses on the National Register of Historic Places in Georgia (U.S. state)
Former county courthouses in Georgia (U.S. state)
Clock towers in Georgia (U.S. state)
Buildings and structures in Jackson County, Georgia
Neoclassical architecture in Georgia (U.S. state)
National Register of Historic Places in Jackson County, Georgia